Tmesisternus unipunctatus is a species of beetle in the family Cerambycidae. It was described by Félix Édouard Guérin-Méneville in 1835.

References

unipunctatus
Beetles described in 1835